The 6th annual Canadian Screen Awards were held on March 11, 2018, to honour achievements in Canadian film, television, and digital media production in 2017. Nominations were announced on January 16, 2018.

Emma Hunter and Jonny Harris hosted the ceremony, which was held at the Sony Centre for the Performing Arts in Toronto. The awards in many of the technical and craft categories were presented in a series of advance galas throughout the week, promoted to as Canadian Screen Week, leading up to the main televised ceremony. Anne with an E received the most nominations, with 13 in total.

In the film categories, Maudie won the most awards, with seven, while Alias Grace, The Amazing Race Canada, and Cardinal all tied with six wins each in the television categories.

Film
Nominees and winners are:

Television

Programs

Actors

News and information

Sports

Craft awards

Directing

Music

Writing

Digital media

Multiple nominations and awards

Special awards
Several special awards were given:

Lifetime Achievement Award: Peter Mansbridge
board of directors Award: Margaret Atwood, Jay Switzer
Earle Grey Award: Clark Johnson
 Fan Choice Award: Elise Bauman
Gordon Sinclair Award: Karyn Pugliese
Margaret Collier Award: Denis McGrath
Outstanding Media Innovation Award: Pat Ellingson
Icon Award: Rick Mercer Report
Humanitarian Award: Bell Let's Talk

References

06
2017 film awards
2017 television awards
2018 in Toronto
2018 in Canadian cinema
2018 in Canadian television